Chiang Rai City Football Club (Thai: สโมสรฟุตบอลเชียงรายซิตี้) is a Thai professional football club based in Chiang Rai Province, a city located in the very northern part of Thailand. The club currently plays in Thai League 3 Northern Region.

Stadium and locations

Season by season record

Players

Honours

Domestic leagues
Thai League 4 Northern Region
 Runner-up (1) : 2017
Regional League Northern Division
 Runner-up (1) : 2015

External links
 Official Website
 

Association football clubs established in 2010
Football clubs in Thailand
Sport in Chiang Rai province
2010 establishments in Thailand